Rafael Carmoega Morales (1894–1968) was a Puerto Rican architect from Rio Piedras, Puerto Rico. He was the first Puerto Rican to become State Architect, a position within the Department of the Interior which he held from 1921 to 1936. Carmoega was one of the most accomplished Puerto Rican architects of the 20th century.

Early years

Rafael Carmoega Morales was born in Ponce in 1894.

Training
A 1918 graduate of the Cornell University School of Architecture and subsequent director of the Architectural division of Puerto Rico's Department of the Interior.

Career
He was the first Puerto Rican to become State Architect, a position within the Department of the Interior which he held from 1921 to 1936. In 1936 he went to work for the Puerto Rico Reconstruction Administration (PRRA) where he designed the University of Puerto Rico based on the Parsons Plan of 1924. In 1937 he established a private practice, which was characterized by eclecticism, and a varied mix of architectural styles. As a private architect he produced the designs for the residences of Secundino Lozana (El Cortijo) in Barranquitas barrio-pueblo and Dionisio Trigo in Santurce, the General Electric store in San Juan, Colegio San José in Río Piedras and the Casino de Puerto Rico in El Condado.

Works
Among Carmoega's works are Mercado de las Carnes in Ponce. Carmoega also designed the Capitol Building, the University of Puerto Rico Main Campus at Rio Piedras, the School of Tropical Medicine, and the Mayaguez City Hall, all listed on the National Register. In his interest to preserve Hispanic traditions in the wake of the recent change of sovereignty of Puerto Rico from Spain to the United States, Carmoega utilized the Spanish Baroque and Neo-Mudejar vocabularies in his designs, emphasizing the use of glazed, mosaic tiles in many buildings. The Plaza de los Perros in Ponce is a fine example of this latter style, incorporating glazed mosaics, horseshoe arches, and galleries in a mosque-like space for commercial usage.

Death
Carmoega died in San Juan in 1968.

Papers
The Architecture and Construction Archives at the University of Puerto Rico (AACUPR) holds the Rafael Carmoega collection (1837–1969). Approximately 48 cubic feet in size, the collection contains architectural drawings, photographs, artifacts, textual documents, and publications. The Architectural Drawing Series holds 144 projects organized chronologically. The collection was donated by Mrs. Carmoega, widow of Ramírez, Ms. Margarita Higuera and architect Antonio Higuera in 1989.

See also

 Blas Silva
 Francisco Porrata Doria
 Wiechers-Villaronga Residence
 List of Puerto Ricans

References

External links
The Rafael Carmoega Collection electronic finding aid may be consulted through http://hip.upr.edu:85/ipac20/ipac.jsp?profile=aac--1#focus

1894 births
1968 deaths
People from Río Piedras, Puerto Rico
Ponce Creole architects
Puerto Rican architects
Cornell University College of Architecture, Art, and Planning alumni
20th-century architects
Urban designers